The Broughty Ferry Open was a late Victorian era clay court tennis tournament first staged in 1884 in Broughty Ferry, Dundee, Angus, Scotland. The tournament ran until 1929.

History
The Broughty Ferry Open was a grass court court tennis tournament organised by the Broughty Ferry LTC, Broughty Ferry, Dundee, Angus, Scotland from 1884 to 1929.

References

Clay court tennis tournaments
Defunct tennis tournaments in the United Kingdom